Zairil Khir Johari (born 17 October 1982) is a Malaysian politician who has served as Member of the Penang State Executive Council (EXCO) in the Pakatan Harapan (PH) state administration under Chief Minister Chow Kon Yeow and Member of the Penang State Legislative Assembly (MLA) for Tanjong Bunga since May 2018. He served as the Member of Parliament (MP) for Bukit Bendera from May 2013 to May 2018. He is a member of the Democratic Action Party, a component party of the PH state ruling but federal opposition coalition. In DAP, he served as the Assistant National Publicity Secretary from September 2013 to March 2022, State Vice-Chairman of Penang since December 2013 and Parliamentary Spokesperson of Education, Science and Technology. He is the son of Khir Johari, former federal minister and prominent politician from Barisan Nasional (BN) and Alliance who are the opposing coalitions of PH.

Early life, education and early career 

Zairil attended the Multimedia University in Cyberjaya, graduating with a bachelor's degree in Information Systems Engineering. He then received a Master of Arts from the School of Oriental and African Studies, University of London. Upon his return to Malaysia, he started Chocolab, where he was the chief executive officer. In late 2010, he left the business to pursue politics full-time.

Political career

Member of the Democratic Action Party (since 2010) 
In 2010, Zairil joined the DAP, a component party of Pakatan Rakyat (PR) in opposition to the BN and UMNO federal government. The choice, given that his father was a prominent UMNO politician and that he would be a rare Malay member of the DAP, attracted significant attention. He claimed that UMNO had changed for the worse since his father was a politician, and that "after more than 50 years of UMNO rule, the situation is such that people are being colonised, oppressed by our own people, we do not have any freedom."

Political Secretary to the Secretary-General 
On 23 February 2011, he was appointed as the Political Secretary to Lim Guan Eng, the DAP Secretary-General and Chief Minister of Penang with immediate effect. He henceforth assisted Lim with political matters at party and national level. He was based at the DAP Secretariat in Kuala Lumpur.

State Vice Chairman of Penang (since 2013) 
In 2013 Penang state party convention, Zairil was elected into the DAP Penang State Committee and subsequently appointed vice-chairman. In the 2015 state party convention, he was reelected into the committee, placing third highest out of the fifteen elected members with a total vote of 490 out of 760 delegates, he was reappointed to the same position. In the 2018 Penang state party convention, a major surprise emerged after he was defeated, however, he was co-opted into the committee to save his state vice chairmanship. In the 2021 state party convention, he was reelected this time after his defeat in 2018 and retained his state vice-chairmanship.

Assistant National Publicity Secretary (2013–2022) 
At the DAP National Congress in December 2012, Zairil was elected to the Central Executive Committee (CEC) and appointed as the Assistant National Publicity Secretary. The election was re-run in 2013, after a tabulation error that had resulted in his exclusion. He was successful again the second time around. In November 2017, Zairil was once again re-elected into the CEC and re-appointed as the Assistant National Publicity Secretary. In the 2013 DAP National Congress, he was elected into the central executive committee and appointed as the National Assistant Publicity Secretary, he was reelected and reappointed in 2017 National Congress. However in the 2022 National Congress, he was not reelected into the CEC and was replaced by Hannah Yeoh Tseow Suan as the Assistant National Publicity Secretary.

Penang Institute 
From 2012 to 2016, Zairil headed the Penang Institute, a public policy think tank to the State Government of Penang. Zairil has been in the forefront of co-ordinating most of its major activities in propagating the cause of Penang on the national and international arenas, and providing realistic solutions for the economic and social sustenance of the people of the Penang region Under his leadership, the Institute organised the ASEAN Coalition for Clean Governance (ACCG). The inaugural conference was held in June 2012, attracting participants from seven countries around the region.

In March 2014, Zairil was promoted to the post of Executive Director and continued to hold this post until December 2016, when he stepped down to take over the reins of the Football Association of Penang. He has since been appointed as a Senior Fellow of Penang Institute.

Member of Parliament (2013–2018) 
In the 2013 general election, Zairil won the Bukit Bendera parliamentary seat polling 45,591 votes defeating Barisan National candidate with 32,778 majority. He also gained one of the highest majorities in the election. He was also the youngest candidate to win a federal seat in the election at the age of 30.

Member of the Penang State Legislative Assembly (since 2018) 
In the 2018 Penang state election, Zairil was fielded to contest for the Tanjong Bunga seat where he faced off against Barisan Nasional Penang Chairman Teng Chang Yeow. Considered one of the more challenging seats due to controversies involving the former  Tanjong Bunga MLA from DAP who had left the party, Zairil went on to defeat Teng by a majority of 9,343, nearly doubling the previous majority. Following his defeat, Teng announced his retirement from politics after his huge defeat. Zairil was not nominated to contest for his Bukit Bendera seat after holding for a term from 2013 to 2018 and hence transferred to the Penang state level from the federal level.

Member of the Penang State Executive Council (since 2018) 
With Pakatan Harapan emerging victorious and being reelected to the power as the Penang state government in the 2018 Penang state election as well as elected to the power as federal government for the very first time in the 2018 general election, then Chief Minister of Penang Lim Guan Eng was appointed as the new Minister of Finance and transferred to the federal level by then Prime Minister Mahathir Mohamad, while National Vice Chairman and State Chairman of Penang of DAP and EXCO member Chow Kon Yeow took over the reins as new Chief Minister of Penang. A new Penang State Executive Council was formed with Zairil being appointed as member for Public Works, Utilities and Flood Mitigation. During a mid-term review exercise, Zairil took new portfolios and relinquished the old ones, which are the Infrastructure and Transport, with the latter being an additional portfolio.

Personal life
In December 2018, Zairil married lawyer and political activist Dyana Sofya Mohd Daud who was also a candidate in the 2014 Telok Intan by-election. In 2020, Zairil formed a rock band called Priwayat, in which he is the pianist and songwriter.

Election results

Publications 
Zairil was a columnist for the now-defunct news portal, The Malaysian Insider, from 2011 until its closure in 2016. He currently writes regularly for The Penang Monthly. In 2017, he published his first book, Finding Malaysia: Making Sense of an Eccentric Nation, a collection of his selected writings on identity politics, political Islam, federalism and education. Finding Malaysia proved to be one of publisher Gerakbudaya's best-selling books of 2017.

Zairil has also published book chapters in Secularism, Religion, and Democracy in Southeast Asia by Vidhu Verma, Policies and Politics in Malaysian Education: Education Reforms, Nationalism and Neoliberalism by Cynthia Joseph, Dialog: Thoughts on Tunku's Timeless Thinking by the think tank IDEAS, and Young and Malay: Growing up in Multicultural Malaysia by Ooi Kee Beng and Wan Hamidi Hamid.

References

External links 
 Zairil Khir Johari – The Rocket
 Zairil: I will earn my own stripes
 Umno Veteran Khir Johari Dies Of Heart Attack, 19 November 2006 17:04 PM

Living people
1982 births
Malaysian people of Malay descent
Malaysian people of Chinese descent
Malaysian Muslims
Democratic Action Party (Malaysia) politicians
Members of the Dewan Rakyat
Members of the Penang State Legislative Assembly
Penang state executive councillors
Alumni of SOAS University of London
21st-century Malaysian politicians